Scott Smith (born August 13, 1972 in Winnipeg, Manitoba) is a former field hockey player from Canada who earned his first senior cap for the Men's National Team in India in 1995.

The ex-resident of Boston, United States has worked as an NCAA Field Hockey Coach.

International senior competitions
 1995 – India Gold Cup, Chandigarh
 1999 – World Indoor Classics, Glasgow (1st)
 1999 – Akhbar El Yom Tournament, Cairo (3rd)
 1999 – Sultan Azlan Shah Cup, Kuala Lumpur (4th)
 2002 – Indoor Pan American Cup, Rockville, Maryland (1st)

External links
Field Hockey Canada

1972 births
Living people
Canadian expatriate sportspeople in the United States
Canadian male field hockey players
Canadian people of British descent
Sportspeople from Boston
Field hockey players from Winnipeg